Weapon of Choice may refer to:

 Weapon of choice, a weapon commonly associated with a certain group or individual

Music
 Weapon of Choice (band), a band led by Lonnie Marshall
 Weapons of Choice (album), a 2006 album by Treat
 "Weapon of Choice" (song), a 2000 song by Fatboy Slim
 "Weapon of Choice", a 2007 song by Black Rebel Motorcycle Club from Baby 81

Other uses
 Weapons of Choice, a 2004 novel by John Birmingham
 Gallifrey: Weapon of Choice, the first audio drama from the Gallifrey audio series
 Weapon of Choice (video game), an Xbox Live Community Game game developed by Mommy's Best Games